Matryoshka is a Persian-language satire based on selected short stories of Anton Chekhov, translated, written, and directed by Parsa Pirouzfar. The play has over 30 characters all performed by the playwright and the theatre director Parsa Pirouzfar in its theatrical production.

The play 
Matryoshka first premiered on 13 September 2015 at Theatre West, as a solo performance, in Los Angeles. The play subsequently ran for two years in the US cities of Los Angeles, San Diego, and Berkeley as well as Toronto, Vancouver and Montreal in Canada in 2015 and 2016; and finally, after multiple performances finished its staging in Tehran in Iran in 2017.

Matryoshka was particularly important to Parsa Pirouzfar's career. His performance playing over 30 characters of the play all by himself was unique. Matryoshka earned Parsa Pirouzfar the Golden Statue Award for Best Actor in the 35th Celebration of the annual Fajr International Theatre Festival in Tehran, Iran in 2017.

Episodes 

 The Death of a Government Clerk
 How Dmitry Kuldarov became famous overnight? (Joy)
 The Trial
 Cyclothymia (or) Periodic Insanity
 The Settlement (A Nincompoop)
 A Noble Woman Who Left Us (In the Post Office)
 A Masterpiece of Art (A Work of Art)
 The Chameleon

Date of performances

United States 
 1st Performance: Theatre West, Los Angeles, 13, 20 and 27 September 2015 
 2nd Performance: Theatre West, Los Angeles, 9 January 2016 
 3rd Performance: AVO Playhouse, North County San Diego, 30 April 2016 
 4th Performance: Live Oak Theatre, Berkeley, 14 and 15 May 2016

Canada 
 1st Performance: Richmond Hill Centre for the Performing Arts, Toronto, 2 October 2015 
 2nd Performance: D.B. Clarke Theatre, Montreal, 10 October 2015  
 3rd Performance: Richmond Hill Centre for the Performing Arts, Toronto, 22 January 2016 
 4th Performance: Kay Meek Arts Centre, Vancouver, 24 April 2016

Iran 
 1st Performance: Iranshahr Amphitheatre (Tamashakhaneh Iranshahr), Tehran, From 5 September to 7 October 2016  
 2nd Performance: Paliz Amphitheatre (Tamashakhaneh Paliz), Tehran, From 1 November 2016 to 30 January 2017 
 3rd Performance: Paliz Amphitheatre (Tamashakhaneh Paliz), Tehran, From 30 July to 15 September 2017 
 4th Performance: Iranshahr Amphitheatre (Tamashakhaneh Iranshahr), Tehran, From 17 to 28 September 2017

Characters 
1st episode:

 Ivan Ivanovich Cherbiyakov
 Pyotr Petrovich (Ivan's colleague)
 General ‌Brizyalov
 Yuliya (Ivan's wife)
 Dmitry Kuldarov (General Bryzjalov's secretary)
 Zalikhvatsky (Chief of police, the character in Ivan's dream)

2nd episode:

 Dmitry Kul'darov (Son)
 Nikolay (Father)
 Maman (Mother)

3rd episode:

 Judge
 Otchumiyelov (Inspector of the case)
 Sidorchel Met'sov (the Accused)
 Okhov (Lawyer)
 Witness in the court (an old man)
 Witness in the court (a woman)

4th episode:

 Simiyon Maksimov (an old man in the bar, friend of Dmitry)
 Dmitry Kul'darov
 Piyotr Petrovich
 Konderashkin (Nastenka's Father)
 Doctor

5th episode:

 Doctor
 Yuliya Vasiliyevna (the widow of Ivan Ivanovich Cherbijakov, nanny in Doctor's house)

6th episode:

 Father Grigory
 Semiyon Maksimov
 Piyotr Petrovich
 Kopertsov (Head of post office; Husband of Aliyona – the Noble Woman)

7th episode:

 Doctor
 Sasha (Friend & patient of the Doctor)
 Okhov (the Lawyer, friend of the Doctor)
 Shashkin (the Theatre Actor, friend of Okhov)

8th episode:

 Zalikhvatski (Police Chief)
 Dmitry Kul'darov
 Yeldirin (Constable)
 General Zhigalov
 Sasha
 Prokhor (General Zhigalov's Cook)
 Dog of general Zhigalov

Pre-production 

 Director: Parsa Pirouzfar
 Playwright and Translator: Parsa Pirouzfar
 Line producer: Noureddin Heidari Maher
 Stage Designer: Parsa Pirouzfar
 Costume Designer: Parsa Pirouzfar

Cast and Production 
 Actor: Parsa Pirouzfar (all roles)
 Assistant director: Mohamad Goudarziyani
 Executive Producer: Noureddin Heidari Maher
 Assistant Costume Designer: Bahareh Mosadeqiyan
 Stage Manager: Arash Safaei
 Graphic Designer and Photographer: Sadeq Zarjouyan

Awards 
 The 35th 'Fajr Theatre Festival', 2017 

Golden Statue Award for Best Actor in Matryoshka

References 

Russian plays
Iranian plays
Mime
Plays for one performer